Homoeotricha arisanica is a species of tephritid or fruit flies in the genus Homoeotricha of the family Tephritidae.

Distribution
Taiwan.

References

Tephritinae
Insects described in 1933
Diptera of Asia